A Shot at Love with Tila Tequila is an American reality television dating game show similar to the TV show The Bachelor. It premiered on October 9, 2007 on MTV starring Tila Tequila. The series consists of a bisexual-themed reality dating show where 16 heterosexual male men  and 16 lesbian female women contestants live in Tequila's house and compete for her attention and affection. The contestants were not aware of Tequila's bisexuality until the end of the first episode, after ten contestants had been eliminated. The remaining contestants, both male and female, then shared the same home for the remainder of the series. A Shot at Love II premiered on April 22, 2008.

Ratings
The show debuted at No. 1 in its time period across all of cable in the network's target demographic of persons 18–34, averaging a 2.0 rating. It became MTV's second highest-rated series premiere for the year, behind Life of Ryan (August 27, 2007) and tied with Newport Harbor: The Real Orange County (August 15, 2007).

The first season finale had 6.2 million viewers, which at the time was MTV's most watched series telecast.

Criticism and controversy
The show was the subject of a heated online debate. An article critical of the show appeared on The Christian Post on September 13, 2007. Tequila wrote a response in her blog on September 28, 2007, criticizing churches for "bashing" the gay community while thanking God for saving her life. Criticism of the show has come from at least three conservative media organizations: Culture and Media Institute, Media Research Center and Parents Television Council, which named two episodes of the show the "Worst Cable Content of the Week".

Fox News and others stated that Tequila had a steady boyfriend and that the show was a sham, and that she is not bisexual. They cite New York Post's Page Six article. In 2007, Tequila responded to the claims made by Fox and denied them stating "I find it absolutely absurd that they would even make such an ignorant statement," but in 2018 (11 years later) she admitted that the Fox News report was true and that she indeed had a boyfriend while the show was being filmed and aired, stating that she was never actually gay or bisexual, and described her presence on the show as being "gay for pay".

On December 30, 2007, the winning contestant of the season, Bobby Banhart, posted a message on MySpace stating, "She never called me after the last show and no one would give me her number."

Tequila offered her own reasoning for why they broke up:

Spin-offs, supplements, seasons 2 and 3
 A Shot at Love: The Hangover is a supplementary show that shows clips and interviews guests as a recap to the show. It premiered on November 13, 2007 on MTV starring Ryan Stout. The show's debut averaged a 2.85 rating.
 A Shot at Love II with Tila Tequila – The second season premiered on April 22, 2008, and follows the same bisexual-bachelorette formula. The premiere date was announced on Tila Tequila's Spring Break Fantasy Couple. It is set in a Hollywood Hills mansion (the same one as the second season of Rock of Love). It was planned to be aired after That's Amoré! Tequila announced at her Masquerade party, Tila Tequila's New Year's Eve Masquerade, that MTV greenlit her for a second season. During the Masquerade, she revealed that she and Bobby parted ways, which prompted suspicion that she would be the bachelorette during season two of A Shot at Love. News articles confirmed this.
 That's Amore! – Nesci's third spin-off featured former contestant Ashley as his consigliere. It premiered on MTV on March 2, 2008.
 A Double Shot at Love – A third season spin-off premiered on December 9, 2008, with the Ikki Twins replacing Tila Tequila as the host.
 Double Shot at Love (2019 TV series) – A fourth season Jersey Shore hybrid spinoff was announced for a 2019 premiere, with DJ Pauly D and Vinny Guadagnino as the hosts.

Episodes
 Ep. 1 Surprise! I Like Boys and Girls (May The Best Sex Win-title on DVD and iTunes) (first aired October 9, 2007)
 Ep. 2 Can't We All Just Get Along? (Fight For Love-title on DVD and iTunes) (first aired October 16, 2007)
 Ep. 3 Under the Covers (first aired October 23, 2007)
 Ep. 4 A Broken Heart (first aired October 30, 2007)
 Ep. 5 I Always Get What I Want (first aired November 6, 2007)
 Ep. 6 The Cat Fight (first aired November 13, 2007)
 Ep. 7 A Second Chance? (first aired November 20, 2007)
 Ep. 8 Welcome To The Family (first aired November 27, 2007)
 Ep. 9 Three's A Crowd (first aired December 4, 2007)
 Special: One Shot Too Many (originally aired December 11, 2007)
In the week after Episode 9 aired and the week before Episode 10 aired, there was a special episode titled One Shot Too Many. Instead of being a regular episode, it was flashbacks and never before seen footage of events of the previous weeks of the show.
 Ep. 10 I Choose...(This Is Real-title on DVD and iTunes) (first aired December 18, 2007)
 Special: The Final Round (first aired December 23, 2007)

Contestants
The following table lists the roster of contestants for each episode, ordered based on Tila's call-out order.

 Contestants surviving elimination in the first two episodes are arranged alphabetically, while eliminated contestants are arranged based on the order Tequila announced that their shot at love had ended.
 The contestant was eliminated.
 The contestant won a date with Tequila.
 The contestant won a date with Tequila, but was eliminated.
 The contestant left of his/her own accord.
 The contestant won the competition.

Eliminations
The following table explains Tequila's reasons for asking each contestant to leave.
 Some reasons were not stated in the episode in which they aired.

Amanda Ireton

Among the contestants, the comedian and television personality Amanda Ellen Soloman Ireton after the show went on to appear on other MTV television shows Hang Over Show and That's Amore, WETV's Secret Lives of Women, CCTV's The Rack, and Entertainment Television's The Soup and Extra.

She hosted CBS's reality show Big Brother – The reunion special as an interviewer. She starred in Karmina's The Kiss music video. Furthermore Ireton was MTV's columnist and video blogger for A Shot at Love 2.

DVD release

A Shot At Love With Tila Tequila – The Complete Uncensored First Season was released on April 15, 2008. The DVD contains the ten episodes, the reunion listed as episode 11, but does not contain the special episode "One Shot Too Many".  It also includes some extended and deleted scenes.

See also

 The Bachelorette (2003)
 The Bachelorette Australia, Season 7 - An Australian edition of The Bachelorette that was Bisexually oriented (much like A Shot At Love).
 I Love New York (2007)
 Transamerican Love Story (2008)

References

External links
 A Shot at Love with Tila Tequila's official site
 
 Tila's official website
 Analysis of the complete season of 'A Shot at Love'
 

2007 American television series debuts
2000s American reality television series
Bisexuality-related television series
American dating and relationship reality television series
American LGBT-related reality television series
MTV game shows
2000s American game shows
2000s LGBT-related reality television series